Tréguier is a port town in the Côtes-d'Armor department in Brittany in northwestern France. It is the capital of the province of Trégor.

Geography

Tréguier is located 36 m. N.W. of Saint-Brieuc by road. The port is situated about 5½ m. from the English Channel at the confluence of two streams that form the Tréguier River.

History
Tréguier (Trecorum), which dates from the sixth century, grew up round a monastery founded by Saint Tudwal (died c. 564). In the 9th century it became the seat of a bishopric, suppressed on July 12, 1790 (decree of November 14, 1789). Pop. (1906), 2605.

Population

Inhabitants of Tréguier are called trécorrois in French.

Breton language
In 2008, 11.78% of primary school children attended bilingual schools.

History
Count Stephen of Tréguier was the second Earl of Richmond, inheriting the British peerage created by William the Conqueror for his second cousin Alan Rufus.

The United States Navy established a naval air station on 1 November 1918 to operate seaplanes during World War I. The base closed shortly after the First Armistice at Compiègne.

Sights

The cathedral, remarkable in having three towers over the transept, one of which is surmounted by a fine spire, dates from the 14th and 15th centuries. It contains the sumptuous modern mausoleum of Ivo of Kermartin (St Yves; died 1303), a canon of the cathedral and patron saint of lawyers. The building of the cathedral was largely due to him. The Pardon of Saint Ivo, a religious festival, attracts an international audience drawn from the legal profession. To the south of the church there is a cloister (1468) with graceful arcades.

Near the cathedral there is a statue of Ernest Renan, a native of the town. As he was a prominent skeptic, author of the "pagan" Prayer on the Acropolis, the 1903 unveiling of Renan's statue, which also included a depiction of the goddess Athena, led to widespread protests from the Catholic Church. The town also houses the Renan birthplace museum. A notable war memorial, the Pleureuse de Tréguier, was designed by Francis Renaud. A commemorative memorial to Anatole Le Braz by Armel Beaufils is in the jardin du poète.

The port and harbour are picturesque, containing many pretty waterfront restaurants and crêperies. There are dramatic views of the quayside.

Economy
In the past, saw-milling, boat-building and flaxstripping were carried on, together with trade in cereals, cloth, potatoes, etc. The port carried on fishing and a coasting and small foreign trade.

Religious festivals
Tro Breizh (Breton for "Tour of Brittany") is a Catholic pilgrimage that links the towns of the seven founding saints of Brittany, including Tréguier, Saint Tudwal's town.

The Pardon of Saint Yves is a major event. As Yves is patron saint of the legal profession, it attracts Catholic lawyers and judges from all over the world.

Personalities
Tréguier was the birthplace of:
 Ernest Renan (1823–1892), philosopher, biblical scholar, and historian of religion.
 Ernest Hello (1828–1885), critic and writer.
 Hervaeus Natalis (c. 1260–1323), 14th Master General of the Dominicans.
 Joseph Savina (1901–1983), designer and sculptor, lived and worked here.

See also
 Ancient Diocese of Tréguier
Communes of the Côtes-d'Armor department
The Calvary at Kergrist-Moëlou

References

 Eric Keraudren & Luc Corlouër, Northern Tregor in the past, 2022, Éditions le Cormoran, book 140 pages, 120 pictures.

External links

 Tourism office website 
 Town council website 

Communes of Côtes-d'Armor
Port cities and towns on the French Atlantic coast
Counts of Tréguier